San Miguel Tequixtepec  is a town and municipality in Oaxaca in south-western Mexico. The municipality covers an area of 146.72 km². 
It is part of the Coixtlahuaca district in the Mixteca Region.

As of 2005, the municipality had a total population of 964.

References

Municipalities of Oaxaca